Maximilian Felix Christoph Wilhelm Leopold Reinhold Albert Fürchtegott von Versen (born November 30, 1833 in Wurchow; died October 7, 1893 in Berlin) was a German general and nobleman.

Career
Maximilian was the son of Johann Georg Leopold von Versen and first wife Hulda Wilhelmine Luise Henriette Leopoldine Ottilie von Glasenapp. Like his father, Maximilian was an officer in the Prussian Army. During the Austro-Prussian War in 1866, with the rank of Major of Cavalry, he served on the staff of the cavalry division of the Second Army and received the Pour le Merite for the Battle of Königgrätz.

In the next year he requested his temporary resignation from the army to visit the battlefields of Paraguay because of the ferocious resistance presented by the Paraguayans and the "admirable strategy" of Francisco Solano López during the Paraguayan War. King William I of Prussia approved his request, and he went to South America, where he was made prisoner of both the allied forces of Brazil, Argentina and Uruguay (they thought he was hired by Lopez to command his armies), and of the Paraguayans (López thought Von Versen was a spy hired by the allied forces to murder him). He survived the conflict and wrote these episodes and his impressions in the book "Travels in South America and the Great South American War".

Von Versen rejoined the Prussian Army in 1869 and fought in the Franco-Prussian War. He continued to serve throughout the rest of the century; his assignments including being a general-adjutant to Emperor Wilhelm II of Germany, commanding the Guards Cavalry Division and eventually being named commanding general of the III Army Corps. He received his final promotion to General of the Cavalry in 1892 and died in the following year.

Marriage and children
He married in Wiesbaden on May 16, 1871 Alice Brown Clemens (St. Louis, Independent City, Missouri, May 12, 1850 – Burzlaff, August 19, 1912), Lady of Burzlaff and Mandelatz, daughter of James Clemens, Jr. and wife Elizabeth "Eliza" Brown Mullanphy, and had issue, among whom a daughter Hulda Elisabeth Anna von Versen (Merseburg, March 18, 1872 – West Berlin, May 4, 1954), married in Berlin on September 9, 1893 with Georg Gustav von Arnim.

References

1833 births
1893 deaths
German untitled nobility
Generals of Cavalry (Prussia)
German military personnel of the Franco-Prussian War
Prussian people of the Austro-Prussian War
Recipients of the Pour le Mérite (military class)
Recipients of the Iron Cross (1870), 1st class
Grand Crosses of the Military Merit Order (Bavaria)
Recipients of the Military Merit Cross (Mecklenburg-Schwerin)
Recipients of the Order of the Crown (Italy)
Grand Crosses of the Order of Aviz
Recipients of the Order of St. Anna, 2nd class
Commanders of the Order of Isabella the Catholic
Commanders Grand Cross of the Order of the Sword